Boleslaus III may refer to:

 Boleslaus III of Bohemia (c. 965–1037), Duke of Bohemia
 Boleslaus III the Wrymouth (1086–1138), Duke of Poland